This is a List of Astronomy Outreach Resources in Europe originally started as an initiative within the framework of the Astronet EU FP7 project.

Scientific Institutions, Observatories, and National Scientific Societies

Scientific institutions and Observatories 

 List of astronomical observatories (not only outreach)
 IAU Office for Astronomy Outreach
 European Southern Observatory (ESO)
 ESO Science Outreach Network (ESON)
 European Space Agency (ESA) 
 CERN outreach
 Instituto de Astrofísica de Canarias (IAC, Spain)
 Instituto de Astrofísica de Andalucía (IAA-CSIC, Spain) 
 Spanish National Observatory
 Centre of AstroBiology (CAB-CSIC, Spain) 
 University of La Rioja (Spain) 
 Dublin Institute for Advanced Studies (Ireland) 
 Queen Mary Astronomical Observatory (UK)
 University of Oxford Dept of Physics (UK) 
 Nottingham Trend University Observatory (UK)
 University of Glasgow A&A group (UK)
 Observatoire de Paris 
 Observatoire de Bordeaux 
 Institut de Radioastronomie Millimétrique (IRAM) 
 GLObal Robotic-telescopes Intelligent Array (GLORIA Project)
 EU-HOU network of demonstration radio telescopes
 Italian National Institute for Astrophysics (INAF)
 Educational resources of INAF (work in progress)
 Osservatorio Astronomico di Cagliari (Italy)
 Onsala Space Observatory (Sweden)

National Astronomical Societies 

 List of astronomical societies 
 AstroWeb
 Sociedad Española de Astronomía (SEA)
 Royal Astronomical Society (UK)
 Swedish Astronomical Society (Sweden)

Science Museums and Planetaria 

 International Planetarium Society
 Haus der Astronomie Heidelberg
 CosmoCaixa Barcelona (Spain) 
 The Observatory (Greenwich) Science Centre (UK)
 The Jodrell Bank Discovery Centre (UK)
 NUI Galway Centre for Astronomy (UK)
 University of Cambridge Centre for Astronomy (UK)
 Herschel Museum of Astronomy (UK) 
 National Museums Scotland (UK) 
 Deutsches Museum (Germany)
 Cité de l’Espace Toulouse
 Tycho Brahe Planetarium (Denmark)

Projects 

 Hands on Universe (EU-HoU) 
 EU Universe Awareness (UNAWE) 
 Europlanet
 EuroVO AIDA project
 Creative Space (UK)

Amateur astronomy groups 

 List of Amateur astronomy groups in Europe
 AstroWeb (2007)
 List of Amateur astronomy groups in Spain

Magazines, publications, and resources on the web

Publications 

 The ESO Messenger
 Revista AstronomíA (Spain)
 Astronomy Now (UK) 
 Astronomie Magazine (France)
 Populär Astronomi (Sweden)
 TUIMP "The Universe In My Pocket", free astronomy booklets in many languages

Blogs, social networks, and resources on the web 

 Space and Astronomy websites
 UNAWE Space Scoop
 Henrietta Leawitt (videos, Spanish)
 SpaceWeather
 Blogs in Spanish
 Radioastronomy from Home
 Beginners Guide to Astronomy

Campaigns 

 Globe at night

Commercial companies, astronomical lodging, star parties 

 Astronomy events calendar
 Turismo estelar (Spain) 
 European AstroFest 2015 (UK)
 EducaCiencia.es (Spain)

Other resources 

 IAU network of contact points for outreach
 IAU directory
 IAU “Why is Astronomy important?”
 Astronomy resources in Europe
 Map of astronomical resources in project Radionet FP7

References 

Astronomy in Europe
Science in society